Gudrid Thorbjarnardóttir (born possibly around 980–1019) was an Icelandic explorer, born at Laugarbrekka in Snæfellsnes, Iceland.

She appears in the Saga of Erik the Red and the Saga of the Greenlanders, known collectively as the Vinland sagas. She and her husband Þorfinnur Karlsefni led an expedition to Vinland where their son Snorri Þorfinnsson was born, believed to be the first European birth in the Americas outside of Greenland.

In Iceland, Gudrid is known by her byname víðförla (lit. wide-fared or far-travelled).

Biography
As recorded in The Saga of Eirik the Red, Gudrid was the daughter of a chieftain by the name of Thorbjorn of Laugarbrekka. As the story goes, a young man by the name of Einar asked for her hand in marriage, but because his father was a slave, Gudrid's father refused to give her hand in marriage.  Gudrid and her father promptly left Iceland and voyaged to Greenland to accompany Eirik the Red. Thirty others went with them on the journey, but the group experienced complications due to poor weather, which slowed their progress during the summer. After this setback, illness plagued the group and half of the company died. Despite these failures, Gudrid and her father landed safely in Greenland in the winter. Although it is not mentioned in The Saga of Eirik the Red, according to the Saga of the Greenlanders, at the time Gudrid was married to a Norwegian merchant named Thorir. According to this account, Leif Eirikson rescued Gudrid and fifteen men from a skerry, brought them safely to Brattahlíð, and invited Thorir and Gudrid to stay there with him. That winter, Thorir died of illness.

In Eirik the Red's Saga, Gudrid exemplifies the transition from the pagan Norse religion to Christianity.  One winter, Gudrid, her father Thorbjorn, and his companions feast at the home of Thorkel, who is visited by a seeress named Thorbjorg.  Thorbjorg arrives at Thorkel's home, intending to carry out several magic rites, specifically ward songs, for which she needs the women present to help chant.  Gudrid is the only woman present who knows the songs, having been taught them by her foster-mother Halldis, but she tells Thorbjorg that "These are the sort of actions in which I intend to take no part, because I am a Christian woman".  With minimal effort, however, Thorbjorg and Thorkel convince Gudrid that taking part in the chants will help the people present, and not damage her status as a Christian woman.  Gudrid performs the songs with admirable skill.

According to both sagas, Gudrid then married Thorstein Eiriksson, Leif Eiriksson's younger brother and Eirik the Red's son. According to the Saga of the Greenlanders, Gudrid then accompanied her husband on his quest to Vinland, with the hope that he could retrieve the body of his brother Thorvald. The two spent the winter in Lysufjord with a man by the name of Thorstein the Black and his wife Grimhild, but illness soon struck the group and both Grimhild and Gudrid's husband Thorstein died. According to this account, Thorstein temporarily rises from his dead bed to tell Gudrid that she will be married to an Icelander and that they will have a long life together with many descendants. He stated that she would leave Greenland to go to Norway and then Iceland, and after a pilgrimage south, she would return to Iceland, where a church would be built near her farm.  According to the Saga of Eirik the Red, Thorstein makes the voyage to Vinland by himself, and it is only upon his return that the two marry. According to the Saga, "Thorstein had a farm and livestock in the western settlement at a place called Lysufjord" and another man by the name of Thorstein (whose wife in this version is named Sigrid) owned a half-share on this farm. The couple moved to the farm and, as in the Saga of the Greenlanders, Thorstein died and told Gudrid of her future, although in this version he focuses more on the importance of Christianity, asking Gudrid to "donate their money to the poor."

After his death, Gudrid moved back to Brattahlíð, where she married a merchant named Thorfinn Karlsefni, who is described in the Saga of Eirik the Red as being "a man of good family and good means" and "a merchant of good repute". According to The Saga of the Greenlanders, after their marriage, and at Gudrid's urging, the two led an attempt to settle Vínland with sixty men, five women, and a cargo of various livestock (while it is implied in The Saga of Eirik the Red that she accompanies him, Gudrid is never actually mentioned in the account of the journey).  While in Vínland, the couple had a son whom they named Snorri Thorfinnsson, who is the first European reported to be born in the Western Hemisphere. There is speculation about the birth date of Snorri with birth years such as 1005, 1009, and 1012 being postulated, but all sources agree that he was born between 1005 and 1013. According to the Vinland sagas, when Snorri was 3 years old, the family left Vinland because of hostilities with indigenous peoples (called Skrælingar by the settlers, meaning "barbarians").  The family returned to the Glaumbær farm in Seyluhreppur, Iceland.

According to The Saga of Eirik the Red, the couple had another son named Thorbjorn. Although it is only mentioned in The Saga of the Greenlanders, Thorfin died, leaving Gudrid to live as a widow.

Christianisation of Iceland during this period meant that religious conversions were common.  Gudrid converted to Christianity and, when Snorri married, went on a pilgrimage to Rome. While some have discussed the possibility that Gudrid spoke with the Pope on her journey, there is no proof of it.  While she was away, Snorri built a church near the estate, fulfilling the prediction that Thorstein had made. When she came back from Rome, she became a nun and lived in the church as a hermit.

Genealogy

Her son Snorri Thorfinnsson had two children; a daughter named Hallfrid, and a son named Thorgeir. Hallfrid was the mother of Thorlak Runolfsson, bishop of Skálholt in the south of Iceland. Thorgeir was the father of Yngvild, the mother of the first Bishop Brand. One of the descendants of her son Thorbjorn, Bjorn Gilsson, was also a bishop of Hólar.

Below is the genealogy of descendants of Snorri, as given in the close of each saga, Grœnlendinga saga ch. 9 and  Eiríks saga ch. 14. It is supplemented with further ancestral information from (Eiríks saga ch. 7 and Landnámabók), a more complete family tree for which, see Thorfinn Karlsefni.

Memorials

There is a statue created by the sculptor Ásmundur Sveinsson in 1938 for the 1939 New York World's Fair of Gudrid on display at Glaumbær, in Iceland. Other copies of this statue are on display in Laugarbrekka in the Snæfellsnes peninsula on Iceland and in Ottawa, Canada.  The statue depicts her on a boat, carrying her son Snorri on her shoulder.

In popular culture

 Her tale is told in the novel Gudrid the Fair by Maurice Hewlett.
 In The Sea Road by Scottish writer Margaret Elphinstone (Canongate Books, 2000).
 Her story is told by Dutch author Mathijs Deen in Over oude wegen ('On Old Roads'), a collection of historical European travelogues.
 In the 1967 comedic science fiction novel The Technicolor Time Machine by Harry Harrison, Gudrid is shown to actually be an actress named Slithey Tove who was left behind by a time-traveling film crew after she fell in love with Ottar, an 11th-century Viking whose formal name is later revealed to be Thorfinn Karlsefni.
 Gudrid is featured in Makoto Yukimura's manga Vinland Saga which follows the story of Thorfinn Karlsefni and his journey to Vinland.
 Gudrid is a central character in the Danish novel Nornespind by Gert Maarløw Nicolaisen. The novel describes her youth in Iceland and Eric the Red's journey to Greenland.

Notes

References
Texts

 

.

Translations

 

Studies

External links
 Gudrid Thorbjarnardóttir ... the woman who found the New World 500 years before Columbus, The Guardian, 18 April 2020
 The Mystery of the Two Gudrids: A Transcript of First Contact, American Indian Magazine, Winter 2016

Icelandic explorers
Scandinavian explorers of North America
10th-century Icelandic people
11th-century Icelandic people
Converts to Christianity from pagan religions
11th-century deaths
10th-century births
Female explorers
11th-century Icelandic women
10th-century Icelandic women
Norse colonization of North America
Norse settlements in Greenland